Julien Arnaud Absalon (born 16 August 1980) is a French cross-country mountain biker.

Career

2003: Absalon won his first UCI Mountain Bike World Cup.

2004: Gold at World Champions and the Athens Olympic Games.

2005: Absalon again won the World Championships.

2006: Winner at the World Championships, European Championships, French Championships and the overall World Cup.

2007: World Champion and World Cup Champion

2008: Won 2nd Gold Medal at the Beijing Olympic Games, World Cup Champion

2009: Number 1 World Ranking for all but 5 days of the year.  Winner of UCI MTB World Cup for the 5th time, silver at the World Championships

2010: 2nd Overall at World Championships

2011: 3rd at the World Championships and World Cup

2012: At the 2012 Summer Olympics cross-country race, he suffered a tyre puncture in the opening lap. After changing tyre and noticing that he was trailing the leader by 55 seconds, he decided to abandon the race, seeing that his chances of winning a medal had disappeared.

2013: Won European Championships

2014: Wins 5th World Championship title, French and European Championships.  His season was cut short when, that November, he suffered a broken collarbone during a cyclocross race.

2015: Absalon wins the European Championships, French Championships, and finished second overall in the World Championships. Completed the season ranked world number 1.

2016: Finishes the Rio Olympic Games in 8th place.

He has been overall winner of the World Cup mountain bike cross-country series seven times (2003, 2006–2009, 2014, 2016) and has won a record 33 World Cup cross-country races as of 4 September 2016. He won five cross-country Mountain Bike World Championships (2004–2007, 2014). He has also won all fourteen French cross-country championships between 2003 and 2016, and five European Championships (2006, 2013–2016). He currently rides for the BMC Racing Team. He previously rode for Bianchi (2001–2006) and Orbea (2007–2012).

References

External links 
Official website in French
Julien Absalon profile 
2012 Olympic Games biography

1980 births
Living people
People from Remiremont
Cyclists at the 2004 Summer Olympics
Cyclists at the 2008 Summer Olympics
Cyclists at the 2012 Summer Olympics
Cyclists at the 2016 Summer Olympics
French male cyclists
Cross-country mountain bikers
Olympic cyclists of France
Olympic gold medalists for France
Olympic medalists in cycling
Medalists at the 2008 Summer Olympics
Officers of the Ordre national du Mérite
UCI Mountain Bike World Champions (men)
European champions for France
Medalists at the 2004 Summer Olympics
Sportspeople from Vosges (department)
Cyclists from Grand Est